Robert Emrys James (1 September 1928 – 5 February 1989) was a Welsh Shakespearean actor. He also performed in many theatre and TV parts between 1960 and 1989, and was an Associate Artist of the Royal Shakespeare Company. He was born in Machynlleth, the son of a railwayman, and attended the University of Wales, Aberystwyth.

Selected theatre work
After training at RADA, in 1953 James joined Peter Hall and John Barton's Oxford Playhouse-based Elizabethan Theatre Company. In 1956 he played his first season at Stratford, taking the roles of Guildernstern, Salerio in The Merchant of Venice and Claudio in Measure for Measure. Seasons at the Bristol Old Vic and the Old Vic, London, followed.

Notable roles at the RSC included Sir Hugh Evans in The Merry Wives of Windsor, 1968; Gower in Pericles, 1969; Feste in Twelfth Night, 1969; The Boss in Günter Grass' The Plebeians Rehearse the Uprising, 1970; The Cardinal in John Webster's The Duchess of Malfi, 1971; Shylock in The Merchant of Venice, 1971; Iago in Othello, 1971; the title role in King John, 1974; Mephistopheles in Christopher Marlowe's Doctor Faustus, 1974; Chorus in Henry V, 1975; the title role in Henry IV, Parts 1 and 2, 1975–76; York in Henry VI, parts I, II and III, 1977–78; Jaques in As You Like It, 1977; Edgar in Strindberg's The Dance of Death, 1978; Cassius in Julius Caesar, 1983; Malvolio in Twelfth Night, 1984; and Sir Giles Overreach in Philip Massinger's A New Way to Pay Old Debts, 1984.

In 1981, he played Lopakhin in The Cherry Orchard at Chichester Festival Theatre.

Family life
In 1958 he married the novelist Sian James, whom he had met while they were both students at the University of Wales. The couple set up home, firstly in London then in Warwickshire, when James began his lasting association with the RSC at Stratford. They had four children: William, Owen, Jo and Anna.

Selected TV and films
 How Green Was My Valley (1960, TV series) -  Gwilym Morgan Jr.
 The House Under the Water (1961, TV series) – Rob TregaronZ-Cars (1963, TV Series) – CyclistMoulded in Earth (1965, TV Series) – Edwin Peele
 Broome Stages (1966, TV Series) – MorganTalking to a Stranger (1966, TV Series) – Gordon LesterSeven of One (1973, TV Series) – Reverend SimmondsSoftly, Softly (1973, TV Series) – Jack HodderWessex Tales (1973, TV Movie) – David Lloyd GeorgePlay of the Month (1973, TV Series) – Doolittle / Dr. PanglossFall of Eagles (1974, TV Mini-Series) – Count TaaffeDays of Hope (1975, TV Mini-Series) – Thomas JonesThe Man in The Iron Mask (1977) – PercerinTestament of Youth (1979, TV Series) – Mr BrittainHammer House of Horror (1980, TV Series) – Dr. HarrisHamlet, Prince of Denmark (1980, TV Movie) – Player King Gauguin the Savage (1980, TV movie) - Maurice SchuffeneckerDoctor Who (1980, TV Series: State of Decay) – Aukon / Anthony O'ConnorOpen All Hours (1981, TV Series) – Eli BickerdykeAntony and Cleopatra (BBC, 1981, TV Movie) – EnobarbusDragonslayer (1981) – Valerian's FatherGiro City (1982) – Tommy WilliamsDombey & Son (TV Mini-Series) – Captain CuttleEureka (1983) – JudgeAnna of the Five Towns (1985, TV Mini-Series) – Ephraim TellwrightGod's Chosen Carpark (1986, TV Movie) – Nathaniel BoxThe Adventures of Sherlock Holmes (1987, TV Series: The Sign of Four) - Inspector Athelney JonesThe Diary of Anne Frank (1987, TV Series) – Otto FrankOut of Love (1988, TV film) – Emrys PriceFather Brown'' (1988?, Italian TV Series - Padre Brown

Further reading

References

External links

Obituary from BBC Wales

1928 births
1989 deaths
People from Machynlleth
Royal Shakespeare Company members
Welsh male stage actors
Welsh male television actors
Welsh-speaking actors
Alumni of Aberystwyth University
20th-century Welsh male actors
Alumni of RADA
Welsh male Shakespearean actors